Haigh Nunatak* is a low peak  northeast of Pickering Nunatak on the east side of the mouth of Lambert Glacier in Antarctica. It was photographed from Australian National Antarctic Research Expeditions aircraft in 1957, and was visited by a geological party of the Soviet Antarctic Expedition in January 1966. It was named by the Antarctic Names Committee of Australia for John Haigh, a geophysicist at Mawson Station in 1965, who accompanied the Soviet party.

References

Nunataks of Mac. Robertson Land